Matasaburō Watanabe (渡辺 又三郎　Watanabe Matasaburō; 1850–1910) was a Japanese politician. 

He lived in Hiroshima Prefecture, and served as Vice President of the Hiroshima Lawyers' Club. Was also among the owners of Chugoku Shimbun. Served as Mayor of Hiroshima from September 9, 1909 to July 3, 1910.

Further reading
 Andrew Fraser, R.H.P. Mason and Philip Mitchell, Japan's Early Parliaments 1890-1905: Structure, Issues and Trends (London & New York, 1995)

19th-century Japanese lawyers
Mayors of Hiroshima
1850 births
1910 deaths
20th-century Japanese lawyers